Lyttini is a tribe of blister beetles in the subfamily Meloinae.

Meloidae